Sedum dendroideum, commonly known as the tree stonecrop or the false hens-and-chickens, is a shrub-like perennial plant that looks much like its Sempervivum look-alike. Native to Mexico, Sedum dendroideum plant thrives in warm, arid climates, as well as in cooler climates. It has been naturalized to California, and Ohio.

Uses

Ornamental
Due to their appearance and hardiness, like many plants in the sedum family, tree stonecrop are cultivated as garden plants. In winter, its leaves turn red.

Traditional medicine
In traditional Brazilian medicine, the fresh juice from the leaves of the tree stonecrop plant is used for the treatment of gastric and inflammatory disorders. In 2005, a medical research paper was released studying its uses, finding it had antinociceptive and anti-inflammatory effects in mice.

References

External links

 Drought Smart Plants
 Sedum dendroideum

dendroideum
Garden plants
Medicinal plants
Plants described in 1828
Taxa named by Martín Sessé y Lacasta
Taxa named by José Mariano Mociño
Taxa named by Alphonse Pyramus de Candolle